The 2020 United States presidential election in Wisconsin was held on Tuesday, November 3, 2020, as part of the 2020 United States presidential election in which all 50 states plus the District of Columbia participated. Wisconsin voters chose electors to represent them in the Electoral College via a popular vote, pitting the Republican Party's nominee, incumbent President Donald Trump, and running mate Vice President Mike Pence against Democratic Party nominee, former Vice President Joe Biden, and his running mate California Senator Kamala Harris. Wisconsin has 10 electoral votes in the Electoral College.

The 2020 Democratic National Convention was scheduled to be held at the Fiserv Forum in Milwaukee, but it was moved to the nearby Wisconsin Center due to the COVID-19 pandemic.

Polls of Wisconsin in the lead-up to election day showed a clear Biden lead, averaging in the high single digits. Prior to election day, most news organizations considered that the state was leaning towards Biden. Wisconsin was ultimately won by Biden by a narrow 0.63% margin over Trump, who had won it in 2016 by 0.77% against Hillary Clinton; however, Biden carried the state with a slightly larger margin than Al Gore or John Kerry did in either 2000 or 2004, respectively. Once again, Trump massively outperformed his polling average, which had Biden up 8.4 points in the state, but it was not enough to win it. Trump held his own in counties in northern Wisconsin and also in the WOW counties. Biden became the first Democrat to win the White House without the once-strongly Democratic counties of Kenosha and Forest since Woodrow Wilson in 1916 as well as the first to win without Pepin County since 1944. However, Biden won the highest vote share for a Democrat in Waukesha County, at 38.8%, since Jimmy Carter in 1976. Trump carried Brown County, which is Republican-leaning but competitive, though Biden won the city of Green Bay and improved on Clinton's margin in the county at large by about 3.7 points. Biden won back Sauk County, a county in the driftless region of southwestern Wisconsin; Biden also flipped Door County, which has voted for the winning candidate in each election since 1980, save for 1992.

On November 18, Trump announced that he would request a recount in Milwaukee County and Dane County. On November 29, both counties re-affirmed Biden's victory, giving him a net gain of 87 votes over Trump.

With Ohio, Florida, and Iowa backing the losing candidate for the first time since 1960, 1992, and 2000 respectively, this election established Wisconsin, Michigan, and Pennsylvania as the states with the longest bellwether streak still in effect today. The last time any of them voted against the winning candidate was 2004, when all three voted for losing Democrat John Kerry.

Wisconsin voted 3.77% more Republican than the nation-at-large. This is the first time since 2004 that Wisconsin did not vote for the same candidate as neighboring Iowa.

Primary elections

Effects of the COVID-19 pandemic

Democratic primary

Republican primary
Incumbent President Donald Trump ran unopposed in the Republican primary, and thus received all of Wisconsin's 52 delegates to the 2020 Republican National Convention.

General election

Final predictions

Polling

Graphical summary

Aggregate polls

2020 polls

2019 polls

Former candidates and hypothetical polling

Donald Trump vs. Michael Bloomberg

Donald Trump vs. Cory Booker

Donald Trump vs. Pete Buttigieg

Donald Trump vs. Kamala Harris

Donald Trump vs. Amy Klobuchar

Donald Trump vs. Beto O'Rourke

Donald Trump vs. Bernie Sanders

Donald Trump vs. Elizabeth Warren

with Donald Trump, Joe Biden, and Howard Schultz

with Donald Trump, Bernie Sanders, and Howard Schultz

with Donald Trump and generic Democrat

with Donald Trump and generic Opponent

Green Party and Kanye West ballot access lawsuits
In August 2020, the bipartisan Wisconsin Elections Commission voted to keep rapper Kanye West, an independent presidential candidate, off of the 2020 general election ballot in a 5-1 decision on the basis that West's application arrived too late—arriving in person seconds after the deadline.

The Commission was split along party lines in a 3-3 decision to keep Howie Hawkins, the Green Party presidential candidate off of the 2020 general election ballot. Hawkins gathered 3,623 valid signatures; however, forms with 1,834 signatures had a different address for Hawkins' running mate Angela Walker. The partisan board voted only to certify the 1,789, placing Hawkins/Walker below the 2,000 signatures required to be on the ballot.

Walker subsequently filed a legal petition to be included on the ballot. On September 10, 2020, the Wisconsin Supreme Court ruled that the election officials had to wait to mail absentee ballots until the court decided whether or not to include the Green Party on the ballot. Some municipal election commissions had already mailed out absentee ballots while others were concerned that they would miss the September 17 deadline by which Wisconsin state law required absentee ballots to mailed out to those who requested them. On September 14, 2020, the court ruled that the ballots would remain as-is without Hawkins or West on the ballot stating, "given their delay in asserting their rights, we would be unable to provide meaningful relief without completely upsetting the election."

Electoral slates
These slates of electors were nominated by each party in order to vote in the Electoral College should their candidates win the state:

Results

Between 2016 and 2020, the number of voters in Milwaukee suburban counties voting for the Democratic presidential candidate increased.

By county
Official results by county following recount.

Counties that flipped from Republican to Democratic 
 Door (largest municipality: Sturgeon Bay)
 Sauk (largest municipality: Baraboo)

By congressional district
Despite narrowly losing, Trump won 6 out of 8 congressional districts in Wisconsin, including one held by a Democrat.

Edison exit polls

Analysis
Wisconsin has voted Republican in gubernatorial and senatorial elections a few times prior to 2016, but Wisconsin was still seen as a lean-Democratic state, as it had a blue streak going back to 1988 and had only gone Republican four times since 1964. As such, it made up part of the blue wall. Trump pulled off a surprise win in the state in 2016, in large part due to a collapse in support for Hillary Clinton in the state.

Both the Democratic and Republican candidates improved on their performances in the state in 2020, with Trump achieving a record total number of votes for a Republican candidate in the state of Wisconsin, nearly matching George W. Bush's 2004 performance in percentage. Conversely, Biden had the second most votes ever for a Democrat in Wisconsin, behind Obama's performance in 2008. While Biden's margin of victory was narrow (0.6%), and well behind Barack Obama's performances, it was nonetheless wider than Al Gore's 0.2% in 2000 and John Kerry's 0.4% in 2004.

Joe Biden received strong support in the city of Milwaukee, improving on Clinton's 2016 performance by 3.6 points in its county; Biden received 92% and 60% of the black and Latino vote respectively, with most of that electorate living in Milwaukee County. Both candidates performed well in the state with whites, with Trump carrying whites overall by 6 points, though Biden performed better with college-educated whites. Cementing Biden's victory was his strong performance in Dane County, which he carried by nearly 53 points. Biden would also carry La Crosse County by 13 points, Eau Claire County by 10 points, and flipped Sauk County and the bellwether Door County, while only losing Brown County by 7 points, winning the county seat Green Bay. Biden even made in-roads in Waukesha and Washington counties, nearly breaking 40% in the former and breaking 30% in the latter, though Trump still held these counties with large margins.

On the other hand, Trump was able to hold much of the Driftless region in southwestern Wisconsin; many of these counties, such as Vernon, Crawford, and Grant were reliably Democratic during the latter half of the 20th century, but Trump maintained his results from 2016, solidifying a Republican shift in this part of the state. Additionally, Trump performed strongly in the more traditionally conservative northern counties of Wisconsin. Finally, Trump kept Kenosha County in his column, with both candidates improving there; Kenosha County is significant, as it was the site of the Jacob Blake shooting, which triggered nationwide protests. Biden thus became the first Democrat to win the presidency without carrying Kenosha County since Woodrow Wilson in 1916, and the first Democrat to win the presidency without carrying Pepin County since Franklin D. Roosevelt in 1944.

In terms of partisan lean, Biden was able to win 7% of Republicans in the state, which is significant, as they voted in this cycle by about 5 points more than Democrats. More importantly, Biden won independent voters by 12 points; Hillary Clinton lost this bloc to Trump by 10 points in 2016.

Aftermath

On November 6, Trump campaign manager Bill Stepien said: "There have been reports of irregularities in several Wisconsin counties which raise serious doubts about the validity of the results." No evidence of such "irregularities" has been provided by the Trump campaign.

On November 18, the Trump campaign wired nearly $3 million to the Wisconsin Election Commission in a petition for a partial recount of the 2020 presidential election results. The recount would take place in Milwaukee and Dane counties. "These two counties were selected because they are the locations of the worst irregularities," the campaign claimed in a release.

Milwaukee certified its recount results on November 27, 2020, and led to Joe Biden gaining a net 132 votes. Dane certified its recount results on November 29, 2020, and led to Donald Trump gaining a net 45 votes. In total, the recount across the two counties led to Joe Biden increasing his lead by an additional 87 votes.

In July 2022 the Wisconsin Supreme Court stated that despite their widespread use in the 2020 presidential election "ballot drop
boxes are illegal under Wisconsin statutes".

Electors
On November 30, Wisconsin Governor Tony Evers certified Wisconsin's electors for Biden. The following electors all cast their vote for Biden:
 Meg Andrietsch
 Shelia Stubbs
 Ronald Martin
 Mandela Barnes
 Khary Penebaker
 Mary Arnold
 Patty Schachtner
 Shannon Holsey
 Tony Evers
 Ben Wikler

See also
 United States presidential elections in Wisconsin
 Voter suppression in the United States 2019–2020: Wisconsin
 2020 Wisconsin elections
 2020 United States presidential election
 2020 Democratic Party presidential primaries
 2020 Republican Party presidential primaries
 2020 United States elections

Notes
Voter samples and additional candidates

Partisan clients

References

Further reading
 
 
 
 
 . (describes bellwether Sauk County, Wisconsin)

External links
Wisconsin Elections Commission

  (state affiliate of the U.S. League of Women Voters)

Wisconsin
2020
Presidential